Giddings may refer to:

Giddings (surname)
Giddings, Texas
Mount Giddings, a mountain in Antarctica
Giddings Peak, a mountain in Antarctica
Giddings Hall, Georgetown College
Giddings Road Covered Bridge, a bridge in Ohio, United States 
George Giddings House and Barn, a historic farm in Massachusetts, United States